The wallpaper tax was a property tax introduced in Great Britain in 1712, during the reign of Queen Anne. Patterned, printed, or painted wallpaper was initially taxed at 1d per square yard, rising to 1s (equivalent to £ as of ), by 1809. The tax was bypassed by purchasing untaxed plain paper and having it hand stenciled. The tax was abolished in 1836.

See also

 Brick tax
 Glass tax
 Hearth tax
 Window tax

References 
Notes

Bibliography

History of taxation in the United Kingdom
History of taxation
Property taxes
Wallcoverings
Abolished taxes